Gnathopalystes is a genus of huntsman spiders that was first described by William Joseph Rainbow in 1899.

Species
 it contains ten species, found in Oceania and Asia:
Gnathopalystes aureolus (He & Hu, 2000) – China (Hainan)
Gnathopalystes crucifer (Simon, 1880) – Malaysia or Indonesia (Java)
Gnathopalystes denticulatus (Saha & Raychaudhuri, 2007) – India
Gnathopalystes ferox Rainbow, 1899 (type) – Vanuatu
Gnathopalystes flavidus (Simon, 1897) – Pakistan, India
Gnathopalystes ignicomus (L. Koch, 1875) – Papua New Guinea (New Ireland, New Britain)
Gnathopalystes kochi (Simon, 1880) – India, Myanmar, Malaysia, Indonesia (Java, Sumatra, Borneo)
Gnathopalystes nigriventer (Kulczyński, 1910) – New Guinea, Solomon Is.
Gnathopalystes nigrocornutus (Merian, 1911) – Indonesia (Sulawesi)
Gnathopalystes rutilans (Simon, 1899) – Indonesia (Sumatra)
Gnathopalystes taiwanensis Zhu & Tso, 2006 – Taiwan

See also
 List of Sparassidae species

References

External links
 Biolib

Araneomorphae genera
Sparassidae
Spiders of Asia
Spiders of Oceania
Taxa named by William Joseph Rainbow